Cuba competed at the 2015 Pan American Games in Toronto, Ontario, Canada, from July 10 to 26, 2015.

Greco-Roman wrestler Mijaín López was the flagbearer of the team during the opening ceremony. For first time since 1971, Cuba finished outside the top 2 places, struggling to the 4th position.

Competitors
The following table lists Cuba's delegation per sport and gender.

Archery

Cuba qualified the maximum team of three men and three women, for a total of six athletes.

Men

Women

Athletics

Badminton

Cuba qualified a team of six athletes (three men and three women). Cuba would later receive an additional men's quota.

Baseball

Cuba qualified a men's baseball team, of 24 athletes. Cuba has also qualified a women's team of 18 athletes, for a total of 42 entered competitors.

Men's tournament

Group A

Semifinal

Bronze medal match

Women's tournament

Group A

Basketball

Cuba qualified a women's team of 12 athletes.

Women's tournament

Roster

Group B

Semifinals

Bronze medal match

Beach volleyball

Cuba qualified a men's and women's pair for a total of four athletes.

Canoeing

Sprint
Cuba qualified 11 athletes in the sprint discipline (5 in men's kayak and 5 in women's kayak, 4 in men's canoe and 1 in women's canoe).

Men

Women

Qualification Legend: QF = Qualify to final; QS = Qualify to semifinal

Cycling

Fencing

Cuba qualified 14 fencers (5 men, 9 women).

Men

Women

Field hockey

Cuba qualified both a men's and women's teams, for a total of 32 athletes (16 men and 16 women). Both teams finished in eighth and last place.

Men's tournament

Roster

Pool A

Quarterfinals

Classification round

Seventh place match

Women's tournament

Roster

Pool B

Quarterfinal

Classification round

Seventh place match

Gymnastics

Cuba qualified 17 gymnasts.

Artistic
Cuba qualified a full team of 10 artistic gymnasts.

Men
Team & Individual Qualification

Qualification Legend: Q = Qualified to apparatus final

Women
Team & Individual Qualification

Qualification Legend: Q = Qualified to apparatus final

Individual finals

Rhythmic
Cuba qualified a team of seven rhythmic gymnasts (six in group and one in individual).

Individual

Group

Handball

Cuba qualified a men's and women's teams. Each team will consist of 15 athletes, for a total of 30.

Men's tournament

Group B

Classification round

Fifth place match

Women's tournament

Group B

Classification round

Fifth place match

Judo

Cuba qualified a full team of fourteen judokas (seven men and seven women).

Men

Women

Karate

Cuba qualified 3 athletes.

Modern pentathlon

Cuba qualified a team of 4 athletes (2 men and 2 women).

Rowing

Cuba qualified all 14 boats. The final team consisted of 22 athletes (15 men and 7 women).

Men

Women

Qualification Legend: FA= Final A (medal); FB= Final B (non-medal); R= Repechage DNS= Did not start

Sailing

Cuba qualified 2 boats (three athletes).

Shooting

Cuba qualified 17 shooters.

Softball

Cuba qualified a women's squad of 15 athletes.

Women's tournament

Group A

Synchronized swimming

Cuba qualified a full team of nine athletes.

Table tennis

Cuba qualified a men's and women's team, for a total of six athletes.

Men

Women

Tennis

Cuba received two wildcard spots in the men's events.

Men

Taekwondo

Cuba qualified a team of seven athletes (three men and four women).

Men

Women

Volleyball

Cuba qualified a men's and women's volleyball team, for a total of 24 athletes (12 men and 12 women).

Men's tournament

Quarterfinal

Fifth place match

Women's tournament

Team

Standings

Results

Quarterfinals

Fifth place match

Water polo

Cuba qualified a men's and women's teams. Each team will consist of 13 athletes, for a total of 26.

Men's tournament

Roster

Group A

Fifth to Eight place

Seventh place match

Women's tournament

Roster

Group A

Semifinals

Bronze medal match

Weightlifting

Cuba qualified a team of 8 athletes (7 men and 1 woman).

Wrestling

Cuba qualified 18 wrestlers (12 men and six women), the maximum. Julio Bastida (Greco-Roman 75 kg) was entered into the competition but did not compete and was not a part of the draw.

Men
Freestyle

Greco-Roman

Women
Freestyle

See also
 Cuba at the 2016 Summer Olympics

References

Nations at the 2015 Pan American Games
P
2015